Global Marine Group is a British-headquartered specialist provider of installation, maintenance and repairs of submarine communications cable for the telecommunications, oil & gas and deep sea research industries. To this end, they operate their own a fleet of vessels, ROVs and specialised subsea trenching and burial equipment. Formerly known as Cable & Wireless Marine and British Telecom Marine, it was purchased by Global Crossing in 1999, at which time it received the name it carries today.  In 2004, Global Marine Systems was purchased by Bridgehouse Marine and was completely restructured.  In September 2014, Global Marine was acquired by HC2, and in 2020 by J F Lehman and partners.   Historically, the company has a legacy of over 160 years of cable installation, stemming from the first telegraph cables laid in the 1850s.

Global Marine has a worldwide presence, with offices in Chelmsford, UK and Singapore; depots in Portland, UK; Bermuda; Victoria, Canada; Batangas, Philippines and Batam, Indonesia; Ships are stationed around the world to support both installation of new cables and the maintenance and protection of existing cables. The company is also involved in joint ventures with China Telecom and Huawei.

Since 2002 Global Marine has become increasingly active in the installation of submarine power cables and gained significant market share in the European Offshore Renewables market, in addition to undertaking a number of large power interconnect projects.  The company was responsible for installing the cables connecting the turbines on a host of windfarm projects including Blythe (one of the first trial farms), Horns Rev 1 (the first major commercial windfarm in Denmark), Thornton Bank, Kentish Flats and others.  To support this business Global Marine formed a subsidiary in 2011 called Global Marine Energy.  The development of the energy business included the opening of a new office in Middlesbrough and the construction of a specialist vessel, Cable Enterprise.  The subsidiary company was sold to Prysmian Group, the world’s largest cable manufacturer at the time of sale, in September 2012.

Global Marine today focuses primarily on supporting the telecoms, oil & gas and deep sea research markets.

Group historical achievements 
 1988  Installed first transatlantic fibre optic submarine cable, TAT-8, 
 1989  Installed first private transatlantic fibre optic submarine cable, PTAT 
 1990  Installed first transpacific fibre optic submarine cable, NPC 
 1992  First to plough unarmoured cable over 1,000 km in one continuous operation between Brunei and Singapore 
 1994  First to post-lay bury to 2,000 metres, Pacific Rim West 
 1995  First to bury cable to 10 metres and 4 metres in rock, APCN
 1997  Installed first dedicated internet cable between US and UK
 2003  Achieved deepest water ploughing to a depth of 1699m on the Svalbard system installed 1,350 km within the Arctic Circle.
 2010  Achieved deepest recorded cable burial at Port Klang in Malaysia achieving 14 meters on a power cable connecting to the Island of Pulau Ketam  
 2014  Global Marine was awarded the Order of Distinction by RoSPA in recognition of the company's 15th consecutive year of outstanding occupational health and safety results.
 2014  Global Marine installed the 2014 Uninett project in Svalbard Norway, delivering the world's most northerly fibre optic cable system, deep within the Arctic Circle.

To date Global Marine has installed over 300,000 km of subsea cable, 23% of the world's total.
In addition to this Global Marine with joint venture partners has performed 35% of maintenance operations on world fibre optic cables.

References 

BT Group
Companies based in Chelmsford
British companies established in 1999
Engineering companies of the United Kingdom